Stéphane Bergès (born 9 January 1975 in Senlis) is a French former cyclist.

In his career, he competed in the 2001 and 2002 Tour de France, and most notably won a stage of the 2000 Tour Down Under.

Major results

1997
 1st  Road race, National Under-23 Road Championships
1998
 7th Overall Prudential Tour
1999
 7th Paris–Bourges
 9th Chrono des Herbiers
 10th Overall Tour de l'Avenir
 10th Overall Tour de la Region Wallonne
2000
 1st Stage 3 Tour Down Under
 3rd Overall Circuit de Lorraine
 8th GP de Villers-Cotterêts
2003
 1st Stage 3 Tour de Wallonie
 8th GP de Villers-Cotterêts
 9th Paris–Bourges
2005
 7th Overall Tour du Poitou Charentes
 10th Tour de Vendée
2006
 3rd Duo Normand (with Florent Brard)

References

External links

1975 births
Living people
French male cyclists
People from Senlis
Sportspeople from Oise
Cyclists from Hauts-de-France